Edward John von Dadelszen (6 May 1845–28 May 1922) was a New Zealand public administrator and statistician. He was born in Wavertree, Liverpool,  Lancashire, England on 6 May 1845.

References

1845 births
1922 deaths
English emigrants to New Zealand
New Zealand statisticians
People from Wavertree
New Zealand public servants